Edward Gott was an English professional footballer who played as a goalkeeper.

Career
Gott played for Rawdon and Bradford City.

For Bradford City he made 8 appearances in the Football League.

Sources

References

Year of birth missing
Year of death missing
English footballers
Bradford City A.F.C. players
English Football League players
Association football goalkeepers